Eupithecia subsequaria is a moth in the family Geometridae. It is found in Turkey.

References

Moths described in 1852
subsequaria
Moths of Asia